The  (部民) was a caste during the Yamato period of ancient Japan. Most of them were farmers, but some had special skills and were known as Shinabe. They paid tribute and performed labor for the powerful families, but unlike servants, they lived a family life. The "bemin system" was a social system in Japan prior to the Taika Reforms. It divided the population into  and "", with the bemin being governed by the nobility and the heimin being governed directly by the central government. The bemin were divided into three categories: those governed by the nobility, those governed by the central government through professional organizations such as the "sea bureau" and "textile bureau", and those who were descendants of local leaders and responsible for the royal household's food and security. 

This system existed during the Yamato period and the population was divided into bemin and heimin, with bemin being around half the population and mainly being made up of conquered people, Toraijin, and prisoners of war, while heimin were mainly made up of native commoners.Under this system, the Bemin were considered the private property of the imperial court and local lords, and individuals were divided into different social classes based on their roles and responsibilities.

Although the Bemin were considered property of the lords, this was not chattel slavery and they were not allowed to be bought or sold or separated from their families.

One aspect of the Bemin system was the division of land into two categories: the "Miyake (屯倉)," or imperial land directly controlled by the imperial court, and the "Tadokoro (田荘)," or land controlled by local lords. The Miyake (屯倉) was primarily located in the Yamato region, where the imperial court was based, and included land acquired through expansion and development efforts in the 5th century. The Tadokoro (田荘) was land owned and controlled by local lords and included tools and buildings associated with farming.  Individuals within the Bemin system were also divided into different categories based on their role and responsibility. These included the "be" or general population who provided labor and production for the imperial court and local lords, as well as the shinabe who specialized in certain crafts and provided specialized production.

History 
The Bemin system seems to have been influenced by similar systems in China and other countries, where groups called bukyoku were subordinated to powerful families.

The Bemin system was established during the period of the Five kings of Wa, from the latter half of the fourth century to the beginning of the sixth century, which was the heyday of the Yamato regime in the Korean Peninsula. The large number of technicians and laborers brought back from the Korean peninsula, the Toraijin rapidly raised the level of agricultural and handicraft productivity in Japan, and the application of iron in particular greatly contributed to the development of the Yamato region. From the end of the fourth century to the fifth century, the Yamato court drove these technicians and laborers, including local residents, to carry out large-scale reclamation in the Ji region, resulting in the emergence of Bemin. The system strongly grew in influence in the middle of the sixth century after the "Iwai Rebellion" when Emperor Ankan expanded the system. It was mostly used to conquer and unify various regions, by using the captured ethnic minorities such as the Ezo as slaves and making them perform domestic labor or even use them for burial, but generally did not allow them to engage in production. In contrast, since the blood ties of the conquered tribes could not be easily broken, it was difficult to enslave them as individual slaves, so the original tribal organization was retained and they were collectively enslaved as a whole. Such a collective is called a "Bemin" and the people within the Bemin are called "Bemin people." The system led to the centralization of economic power and the absorption of the lords' power into the state, resulting in the strengthening of local control.

A valuable archaeological discovery, the Okadayama Tomb, also revealed an inscription indicating the existence of a local powerful family, the Nukatabe no Omi, who were in charge of the Nukatabe division in Izumo.

The system of land ownership and labor allocation also sowed the seeds of conflict among the nobles of the clans. The powerful nobles, such as the Daiban, Sukai, and Nakamori clans, also began to give their own clan names to their people. This led to the growth of the Bemin system to its peak, but ultimately contributed to its downfall as it became a source of power struggles and social unrest. Those belonging to powerful families were called kakikyoku. The people were made civilians at the time of the Taika Reform, but were restored by Emperor Tenji, and later re-established by Emperor Temmu. Some of the shinabe remained unregistered and became shinabe and zakudo under the Ritsuryo law.

Examples 
According to the Nihon Shoki Yamato Takeru subjugated the Saeki people and made them Bemin and relocated them to Western Japan.

Shinabe 

Many Bemin were classified as Shinabe and had certain hereditary occupations. Their status varied over time.

See also 
 Shinabe clans

References 

Ancient Japanese institutions
Asuka period
Kofun period